AIVA (Artificial Intelligence Virtual Artist) is an electronic composer recognized by the SACEM.

Description
Created in February 2016, AIVA specializes in classical and symphonic music composition. It became the world's first virtual composer to be recognized by a music society (SACEM).
By reading a large collection of existing works of classical music (written by human composers such as Bach, Beethoven, Mozart) AIVA is capable of detecting regularities in music and on this base composing on its own. The algorithm AIVA is based on deep learning and reinforcement learning architectures. Since January 2019, the company offers a commercial product, Music Engine, capable of generating short (up to 3 minutes) compositions in various styles (rock, pop, jazz, fantasy, shanty, tango, 20th century cinematic, modern cinematic, and Chinese).

AIVA was presented at TED by Pierre Barreau.

Discography 
AIVA is a published composer; its first studio album "Genesis" was released in November 2016. Second album "Among the Stars" in 2018.

 2016 CD album « Genesis » Hv-Com – LEPM 048427. Track listing "Genesis":

 2018 CD album « Among the Stars » Hv-Com – LEPM 048708

Avignon Symphonic Orchestra [ORAP] also performed Aiva's compositions  in April 2017.

Example of scores composed by AIVA
This is the preview of the score Op. n°3 for piano solo "A little chamber music", composed by AIVA.

See also

Applications of artificial intelligence
Computer music
Music and artificial intelligence

References

Computer music software
Applications of artificial intelligence
2016 software